The Adult Use of Marijuana Act (AUMA) (Proposition 64) was a 2016 voter initiative to legalize cannabis in California. The full name is the Control, Regulate and Tax Adult Use of Marijuana Act. The initiative passed with 57% voter approval and became law on November 9, 2016, leading to recreational cannabis sales in California by January 2018.

History
Possession or sale of cannabis in the United States is prohibited by federal law.  In 1970, President Richard Nixon signed the Controlled Substances Act, establishing marijuana as a Schedule I drug, the strictest level of prohibition.  Voters then rejected California Proposition 19 (1972), which sought to remove the criminalization of marijuana under California law.  In 1976, Governor Jerry Brown signed the Moscone Act, which reduced the penalty for possession of marijuana from a felony to a misdemeanor.

Voters passed California Proposition 215 (1996), making California the first state to legalize medical cannabis in the United States.  In United States v. Oakland Cannabis Buyers' Cooperative (2001), the Supreme Court of the United States found that California's medical prescription providers were still subject to criminal prosecution.  In Gonzales v. Raich (2005), the U.S. Supreme Court found that Congress's interstate commerce clause power allowed it to prohibit an Oroville, California woman, who was following California law, from growing and consuming marijuana entirely inside her home.

In September 2010, Governor Arnold Schwarzenegger signed legislation reducing possession of marijuana from a criminal misdemeanor to a civil infraction.  In November voters rejected California Proposition 19 (2010), which would have legalized recreational marijuana use, imposed no state taxes, and allowed employers to fire an employee for workplace use of marijuana only after showing it had caused impaired work.

In 2012, voters passed Washington Initiative 502 and Colorado Amendment 64, which legalized recreational marijuana use in those states.  Two other states followed later in 2014, when voters passed Oregon Ballot Measure 91 (2014) and Alaska Measure 2 (2014).
In July 2015, Lieutenant Governor Gavin Newsom, the American Civil Liberties Union, and Stanford University faculty released the final report of the Blue Ribbon Commission on Marijuana Policy, which recommended regulations for recreational marijuana use in California.

On November 4, 2014, California Proposition 47 was passed. Also known as the Safe Neighborhood and Schools Act, Proposition 47 made the punishment for the possession of controlled substances in the state of California drop down from a felony to misdemeanor. This law's reclassification of possession related felonies as misdemeanors made it possible for those priorly convicted to petition their felony charges which for some means shorter sentences and others less restrictive charges on their record.

On May 4, 2016, the group sponsoring the initiative announced that it had collected over 600,000 signatures for the proposal; enough to get it on the 2016 ballot. On June 28, the measure was certified by the Secretary of State for the November ballot. On July 1, the Secretary of State released a list of propositions with AUMA listed as Proposition 64, then later in the day renumbered it to 63; and, on July 2, released a final list restoring it to Proposition 64.

Content
According to California Legislative Analyst's Office, the measure changes California law to legalize the possession, cultivation, and sale of marijuana. Individuals over age 21 are allowed to possess, cultivate, and sell marijuana; the state regulates commercial activities related to commerce for recreational use; a 15% excise tax and an additional $9.25 per ounce of flower or $2.75 per ounce of leaf will be collected; and possession and cultivation of certain amounts for personal use is legalized statewide.

The Adult Use of Marijuana Act (AUMA) (Proposition 64) provides an array of opportunities ranging from economic stimulation of several markets and industries to financial relief of the criminal justice system, which are over-burdened with backlogged and pending cases for non-violent cannabis offenders. Revenue paid into the new California Marijuana Tax Fund will allocate 60% of outflows to youth programs, 20% to environmental damage clean-up, and 20% to public safety.

Under Prop 64, new state regulation laws will require stringent product development systems to establish distributional industry standards regarding testing, packaging, and labeling.

Prop 64's new state regulations provide a platform for a fully transparent, highly efficient seed-to-sale tracking system through the newly created State Regulatory Agency—the Bureau of Marijuana Control—formerly known as the Bureau of Medical Cannabis Regulation.

Additionally, the Medical Marijuana Industry will be regulated by several other state agencies: the California Department of Food and Agriculture (to license and regulate marijuana cultivation); the California Department of Public Health (to license and monitor manufacturing of marijuana edibles); the California State Water Resources Control Board (to "regulate the environmental impacts of marijuana growing on water quality"); the California Department of Fish and Wildlife (to regulate cultivation-related impacts on local environments); and the California Department of Pesticide Regulation (to regulate nutrients and pesticides utilized for marijuana cultivation).

AUMA allows adults to possess up to an ounce of marijuana.  Adults are also allowed to cultivate up to six marijuana plants inside their homes.  Marijuana packaging is now required to provide the net weight, origin, age, and type of the product, as well as the milligram amount per serving of tetrahydrocannabinol, cannabidiol, and other cannabinoids, and if any pesticides were used during cultivation.

Smoking marijuana in public is subject to a $100 fine. Driving under the influence of marijuana remains illegal, although some California Highway Patrol officers are concerned that they will be unable to identify intoxicated drivers.  The penalty for unlicensed sale of marijuana is now reduced from four years in state prison to six months in county jail.

Businesses selling marijuana require a license from the state-level Bureau of Marijuana Control, and local governments decide permits for businesses to allow on-site consumption. Marijuana shops are prohibited from the sale or consumption of alcohol or tobacco. Local governments are allowed to completely ban marijuana-related businesses.

Reactions and analysis
State financial analysts estimated Proposition 64 could increase tax revenue by hundreds of millions to one billion dollars.  Independent analysts estimated the measure would reduce state and local government expenditures by tens of millions of dollars.

California NORML endorsed the initiative as of March 2016, saying "as well as one of the world's largest economies, California is arguably the most important state to consider marijuana legalization this year." California has the biggest legal cannabis market in the United States due to high population density and high cultivation rates. 

Ballotpedia called the measure "a clear leader and the most likely to reach the ballot in November 2016".

The Los Angeles Times stated in February, 2016 that the measure was one of 20 legalization initiatives for the 2016 ballot and was the "clear favorite to make the November ballot" due to support from individual donors and well-funded advocacy groups. Billionaire Sean Parker donated $1 million to the effort to get the measure on the ballot, and Weedmaps donated $500,000.

Newsweek stated the success of the initiative would be influential given California's national importance as a "regulatory laboratory", and Reason magazine stated it was poised to approximately triple the number of U.S. residents living in states with legalization. Deseret News (Salt Lake City) expressed concern over a "potential problem when it comes to minorities and recreational marijuana" if the measure passed. Deseret News cited an NPR report from Colorado to conclude that in California, white youth arrests could fall faster than those of minorities, or minority arrests could even increase due to lack of minority access to legal sales and nonwhite ownership of cannabis businesses, worsening the effect of "systemic racism" in pursuing drug crime.

California Proposition 64 helps to remedy marijuana related incarceration rates considerably. However, some argue that the passing of the MORE Act is a necessary next step down the path of decriminalization of the substance, as it would remove cannabis from the controlled substances list and declassify marijuana as a schedule 1 drug. 

The MORE Act could potentially help to remedy some of the racial disparities within America's criminal justice system that proposition 64 does not address. According to Forbes roughly 40000 remain behind bars due to cannabis related charges as of 2020. With the racial gap widening over the past 20 years after the War On Drugs campaign took off, a jump from 3:1 to 5:1 between Black and White incarceration rates occurred. In 2014, black people made up roughly 14% of the 127,000 drug charges in California. 

While Proposition 64 decriminalizes the possession of up to 1 ounce of marijuana, the effects are not immediately felt by those with charges made prior to the passing of this law. Those with prior convictions must still petition for shorter sentences, release, or a change from felony to misdemeanor on their records. 

The MORE Act calls for a more transparent system in regards to cannabis companies employer/employee demographics which might help to mitigate issues of monopolization within California's cannabis industry that arouse after proposition 64 was passed in 2016.

Supporters
The California Medical Association endorsed the measure in February 2016. United States Representative Dana Rohrabacher, a Republican, endorsed AUMA in late April 2016. Presidential candidate Bernie Sanders indicated his support for AUMA while campaigning in California in May 2016. The California Democratic Party endorsed AUMA in June 2016. On July 21, 2016, The Sacramento Bee reported that Gov. Gary Johnson, Libertarian candidate for President, endorsed California's initiative to legalize marijuana. Former Speaker of the House Nancy Pelosi endorsed it a few days before the election, becoming "one of the highest ranking politicians ... openly supporting legalization".

Proponents spent $24.7 million fighting for the measure, with the top contribution being $8.8 million from Sean Parker and affiliates.  The measure was supported by the editorial boards of the Los Angeles Times and the San Francisco Chronicle.

Opponents
A number of organizations like the California Association of Highway Patrolmen, the California Hospitals Association, and the Automobile Club of Southern California expressed opposition to the initiative.  The California Teamsters Union switched their position to neutral after contributing a relatively large amount to the opposition campaign. According to Capital Public Radio, a Sacramento Superior Court judge ordered the ballot's official arguments to be rewritten, after U.S. Senator Dianne Feinstein's claim that Proposition 64 would allow marijuana advertising on primetime television was debunked as "mostly false" by PolitiFact.com.

Opponents spent $1.6 million fighting the measure.  The measure was opposed by the editorial board of The Sacramento Bee.

Public opinion

Removal of past cannabis infractions
On January 31, 2018, San Francisco District Attorney George Gascón announced his department would begin to retroactively apply Proposition 64 to misdemeanor and felony marijuana convictions dating back to 1975, recalling and re-sentencing up to 4,940 felony marijuana convictions and dismissing and sealing 3,038 misdemeanors.  Los Angeles and San Joaquin counties announced in April plans to automatically clear about 54,000 marijuana-related convictions. The national non-profit Code for America developed the technology and process to automate the dismissing and sealing of these records, which they first piloted with the San Francisco District Attorney's office, and subsequently extended to Los Angeles, San Joaquin, and Sacramento counties. In 2019, Code for America released an open source playbook and software that made every California county able to dismiss and seal records eligible for expungement under Prop 64 automatically, in bulk.

See also
Cannabis in California
List of 2016 United States cannabis reform proposals

Notes

References

External links
Adult Use of Marijuana Act text
The Adult Use of Marijuana Act Initiative official website
No On Prop. 64
Official Voter guide for California voters, November 2016, pages 14, 90-99, 212-218.

2016 cannabis law reform
Cannabis ballot measures in the United States
Cannabis law in California
Proposed laws of the United States
2016 California ballot propositions
2018 in cannabis